Amphicrates of Athens was a sophist and rhetorician (of the Asiatic school).

Biographical information
Amphicrates was forced to leave Athens (for his own safety from the hatred of later critics, additional sources show him instead only visiting his destination ) in 86 B.C, living henceforward in Seleucia on the Tigris. When responding to a plea for the creation of a rhetoric school in Seleucia he replied that he could not for 

His exile from Greece culminated in death from starvation, caused supposedly by his own abstinence.

See also
 ...bigger fish to fry

References

1st-century BC Athenians
Ancient Greeks who committed suicide
Sophists
Ancient Greek rhetoricians
Year of birth unknown
Year of death unknown
Suicides by starvation